Eurite or Euryte (Εὐρύτη / Eurytē) refers to two characters in Greek mythology:

 The daughter of Hippodamas, son of Achelous the Oceanid. She married Portaon, king of Calydon, and had several children including Aeneas, Agrio, Alcatoo, Melas, Leukoteo, and Esterope. Some sources also mention Aeneas of Calidon as her child. Her daughter Sterope bore Siren to the river-god Achelous.

 A nymph who was the lover of Poseidon, with whom she had a son named Halirrotio. Halirrotio tried to rape Alcipe, daughter of Ares, and was killed by Ares himself. This character is sometimes confused with another nymph named Eurythe, who was also the mother of Halirrhotios but by a different father, and was sometimes referred to as Bathycleia.